Joydeep Mukherjee is an Indian film director, actor and writer primarily associated with Bengali language films.

Career
In 2008, Joydeep started his career with directed television drama serial. Then he directed two more dramas. In 2016, he debuted as a film director with the project of Indo-Bangla joint production thriller drama film Shikari share with Zakir Hossain Simanto. It became the highest-grossing Bengali film of 2016.

Filmography

References

External links
 
 

Living people
Indian television directors
Film directors from Kolkata
Year of birth missing (living people)